IKT may refer to:
 Institute of Knowledge Transfer, a British professional organisation
 International Airport Irkutsk, Russia
 Inuvialuktun, an Inuit language of Canada